Robert D. Siegel is an American screenwriter and film director. He is most known for his work on The Wrestler and The Founder.

The Wrestler won the Golden Lion at the 2008 Venice Film Festival and earned several Best Picture nominations.

Big Fan premiered at the Sundance Film Festival in 2009. It was revealed in an online interview that Siegel attempted to write drafts for a comedy film but it ended up being a drama because of the conflicts in the film as well as avoiding Patton Oswalt being typecast as a comedic character. Big Fan was nominated for the John Cassavetes Award, which honors features made for under $500K, at the Independent Spirit Awards 2010.

Siegel is a graduate of the University of Michigan who later became senior editor of The Onion from 1996 to 1999, and editor-in-chief from 1999 to 2003.

He is married to voice actress Jen Cohn and has a son with her.

Filmography
Film

Television

Cameo Roles

References

External links
 

1971 births
Living people
Place of birth missing (living people)
American male screenwriters
American comedy writers
The Onion people
University of Michigan alumni
People from Long Island
Jewish American screenwriters
Comedy film directors
21st-century American Jews